The 2021–22 Missouri State Lady Bears basketball team represented Missouri State University during the 2021–22 NCAA Division I women's basketball season. The Lady Bears, led by third year head coach Amaka Agugua-Hamilton, played their home games at JQH Arena and were members of the Missouri Valley Conference. 

They finished the season 25–8 and 14–4 in conference play to finish in second place.  As the second seed in the Missouri Valley tournament, they defeated Drake in the quarterfinals before losing to Northern Iowa in the semifinals.  They received an at-large bid to the NCAA tournament and were one of the eleven seeds in the Spokane Regional.  They defeated fellow eleven seed Florida State in the First Four before falling to the sixth seed Ohio State in the first round.

Previous season 

The Lady Bears finished the season 23–3 and 16–0 in conference play to finish as Missouri Valley Conference champions.  As the first seed in the Missouri Valley tournament, they defeated  in the quarterfinals before having to forfeit their Semifinal game.  They received an at-large bid to the NCAA tournament and were the fifth seed in the Alamo Regional.  They defeated twelve seed  and thirteen seed  before falling to the first seed Stanford in the Sweet Sixteen.

Roster

Schedule

Source:

|-
!colspan=6 style=| Exhibition

|-
!colspan=6 style=| Non-conference regular season

|-
!colspan=6 style=| Missouri Valley Conference Season

|-
!colspan=6 style=| Missouri Valley tournament

|-
!colspan=6 style=| NCAA tournament

Rankings

The Coaches Poll did not release a Week 2 poll and the AP Poll did not release a poll after the NCAA Tournament.

References

Missouri State Lady Bears basketball seasons
Missouri State
Missouri State, basketball women
Missouri State, basketball women
Missouri State